Metenolone, or methenolone, is an androgen and anabolic steroid (AAS) which is used in the form of esters such as metenolone acetate (brand name Primobolan, Nibal) and metenolone enanthate (brand name Primobolan Depot, Nibal Injection). Metenolone esters are used mainly in the treatment of anemia due to bone marrow failure. Metenolone acetate is taken by mouth, while metenolone enanthate is given by injection into muscle.

Side effects of metenolone esters include symptoms of masculinization like acne, increased hair growth, voice changes, and increased sexual desire. Metenolone esters are synthetic androgens and anabolic steroids and hence are agonists of the androgen receptor (AR), the biological target of androgens like testosterone and dihydrotestosterone (DHT). They have moderate anabolic effects and weak androgenic effects, as well as no estrogenic effects or risk of liver damage. Metenolone esters are androgen esters and prodrugs of metenolone in the body.

Metenolone esters were introduced for medical use in the early 1960s. In addition to their medical use, metenolone esters are used to improve physique and performance. The drugs are controlled substances in many countries and so non-medical use is generally illicit. They have mostly been discontinued for medical use and have limited availability.

Medical uses
Metenolone, as its esters, is used almost exclusively in the treatment of anemia due to bone marrow failure. It has also been used to treat wasting syndromes due to major surgery, infection, long-term corticosteroid therapy, malnutrition, or other causes. It has also been used to treat osteoporosis and sarcopenia, to inhibit the natural loss of muscle mass with aging, and to promote weight gain in underweight premature infants and children.

Side effects

Side effects of metenolone and its esters include virilization among others.

Pharmacology

Pharmacodynamics

Due to its double bond between the C1 and C2 positions, metenolone is resistant to metabolism by 3α-hydroxysteroid dehydrogenase (3α-HSD). As such, unlike DHT and the closely related DHT derivatives mestanolone (17α-methyl-DHT) and mesterolone (1α-methyl-DHT), metenolone has considerable anabolic effects.

Pharmacokinetics
Metenolone has very low affinity for human serum sex hormone-binding globulin (SHBG), about 16% of that of testosterone and 3% of that of DHT.

Chemistry

Metenolone, also known as 1-methyl-4,5α-dihydro-δ1-testosterone (1-methyl-δ1-DHT) or as 1-methyl-5α-androst-1-en-17β-ol-3-one, is a synthetic androstane steroid and derivative of dihydrotestosterone (DHT). A closely related AAS is mesterolone (1α-methyl-DHT).

Society and culture

Generic names
Metenolone is the generic name of the drug and its , while methenolone is its . It has also been referred to as methylandrostenolone. This synonym should not be confused with methandrostenolone, which is another name for a different AAS known as metandienone.

Doping in sports

Metenolone and its esters are banned from use in sports governed by the World Anti-Doping Agency. The NBA and NBPA also banned the use of metenolone and its esters under the Anti-Drug Program. There are known cases of doping in sports with metenolone esters by professional athletes.

References

External links
 Primobolan (methenolone acetate) - William Llewellyn's Anabolic.org
 Primobolan Depot (methenolone enanthate) - William Llewellyn's Anabolic.org

Secondary alcohols
Androgens and anabolic steroids
Androstanes
Enones
World Anti-Doping Agency prohibited substances